Fargona Stadium is a multi-use stadium in Fergana, Uzbekistan. It is currently used mostly for football matches and serves as the home for Neftchi Farg'ona. The stadium holds 14,600 people.  

Football venues in Uzbekistan